Shinimicas Bridge is a community in the Canadian province of Nova Scotia, located in  Cumberland County. There is lower Shinimicas and Upper Shinimicas. In Shinimicas there are many horse stables and small community gathering places.

According to legend, Shinimicas means Shining River in the MIK'MAQ language.

References
 Shinimicas Bridge on Destination Nova Scotia

Communities in Cumberland County, Nova Scotia
General Service Areas in Nova Scotia